Kattuvithachavan is a 1973 Indian Malayalam-language film, directed and produced by Rev Suvi. The film stars Thikkurissy Sukumaran Nair, Prema, Shobha and J. C. George. The film had musical score by Peter and Reuben.

Cast

Thikkurissy Sukumaran Nair
Prema
Shobha
J. C. George
Baby Padma
Bahadoor
Girish Kumar
Junior Balayya
K. P. Ummer
Madhavan Kutty
Muthu
Radhamani
Rani Chandra
Sujatha
Vijayanirmala

Soundtrack
The music was composed by Peter and Reuben and the lyrics were written by Poovachal Khader.

References

External links
 

1973 films
1970s Malayalam-language films